Mysterious Island (UK: Jules Verne's Mysterious Island) is a 1961 science fiction adventure film about prisoners in the American Civil War who escape in a balloon and then find themselves stranded on a remote island populated by giant and tiny animals.

Loosely based upon the 1874 novel The Mysterious Island (L'Île mystérieuse) by Jules Verne (which was the sequel to two other novels by Verne, 1867's In Search of the Castaways and 1870's Twenty Thousand Leagues Under the Sea), the film was produced by Charles H. Schneer and directed by Cy Endfield.

Shot in Catalonia, Spain, and at Shepperton Studios, Shepperton, England, the film serves as a showcase for Ray Harryhausen's stop motion animation effects. Like several of Harryhausen's classic productions, the musical score was composed by Bernard Herrmann. Another version of the story was produced in 2005.

Plot
In 1865, during the American Civil War, Union soldiers Cyrus Harding, Herbert Brown and Neb Nugent, along with war correspondent Gideon Spillet are being held at the Libby Military Prison in Richmond, Virginia. While escaping, they kidnap Pencroft, a Confederate guard that knows how to pilot a nearby gas balloon.

The balloon carries them westwards, over the Pacific Ocean. A storm arises, tearing open the airship and forcing the men to crash land on an unknown island. This strange place turns out to have lush tropical jungles, harsh plains, and many volcanoes which frequently erupt.

While exploring the island, the men are attacked by a giant crab. They manage to push it into a boiling geyser and have crab meat for dinner. Afterwards, they find two unconscious English ladies, Lady Mary Fairchild and her niece Elena, who were shipwrecked there by the same storm. Working together, the castaways find cover and protection in a cave. A treasure chest later washes ashore. It has a variety of useful items, including rifles, nautical charts, and books such as Robinson Crusoe. Markings upon one of the rifles indicate that it came from the Nautilus. Spillet gives Lady Fairchild a brief summation of the Nautilus, its creator Captain Nemo, and its supposed destruction off the coast of Mexico some eight years earlier. Spillet expresses a sense of respect and admiration for Nemo's genius and principles against war, while Harding derides him for being a madman, someone who killed numerous sailors during his crusade. Using one of the charts, the castaways are able to determine their location and proceed with the construction of a boat on which they can escape the island.

One day, Mary, Elena and Spillet encounter a giant flightless bird, belonging to a prehistoric species called Phorusrhacos. Spillet and the women retreat, while the bird attacks. As it tries to eat Elena, Herbert arrives and apparently kills the creature. Later, as they consume the bird, they discover it was actually killed by a bullet none of them had fired.

A few weeks later, Herbert and Elena are sunning outside when they notice a rivulet of honey. Atop a rocky bluff, they come across a hive of giant bees. While escaping from the hive into a large flooded cave, Herbert and Elena spot the Nautilus. They enter the vessel, but knowing that it belongs to someone else, retreat, swimming out of the cave. Meanwhile, Harding, Spillet, Neb, Mary and Pencroft spot an approaching pirate ship. They try to hide, but are discovered, and a fight ensues. The castaways prevail only after an explosion mysteriously sinks the pirate ship with all hands aboard.

Once outside, the castaways reunite and meet Captain Nemo, who is living aboard his disabled submarine. Nemo has been watching the castaways and secretly assisting them by sending the chest, shooting the giant bird, and sinking the pirate ship. He invites them to dinner aboard the Nautilus. There, they find out that the giant creatures are results of Nemo's genetic experiments to enlarge the world's food resources, thereby eliminating hunger and economic competition which he sees as prime causes for the wars he was striving to end all his life. Due to their fortitude, he has selected them to assist him in his efforts to make his achievements known to the world, especially since the Nautilus is incapacitated beyond repair and the volcano will soon erupt, destroying the island.

When time runs out, the castaways discover that Nemo has invented an air-filled raising system which can refloat the pirate ship, the only readily seaworthy vessel on the island. Nemo teaches them to breathe underwater using his special "shell" air tanks, and they work to raise the ship, despite interference by a giant Ammonite. With the pirate ship raised and seaworthy, the castaways set sail. The volcano erupts and Nemo is killed as the Nautilus is buried. The rest escape and begin the journey home, vowing to continue Nemo's dream of achieving lasting peace throughout the world.

Cast
 Michael Craig as Captain Cyrus Harding
 Joan Greenwood as Lady Mary Fairchild
 Michael Callan as Herbert Brown
 Gary Merrill as Gideon Spilitt
 Herbert Lom as Captain Nemo
 Beth Rogan as Elena Fairchild
 Percy Herbert as Sergeant Pencroft
 Dan Jackson as Corporal Neb Nugent

Production

Development
In May 1959, Columbia announced it had signed a deal with Charles Schneer to distribute nine of his films over three years. The films would include Battle of the Coral Sea, Gulliver's Travels, The Werner Von Braun Story, Mystery Island, Gentleman of China, and Air Force Academy.

Mysterious Island would be the sixth collaboration between Schneer and Ray Harryhausen, beginning with It Came From Beneath the Sea, and the third in color, following The 7th Voyage of Sinbad and The 3 Worlds of Gulliver. Like Sinbad and Gulliver, it would be shot in Spain.

Screenplay
The novel on which the film is based is a sequel to two other novels by Jules Verne, In Search of the Castaways (1867) and Twenty Thousand Leagues Under the Sea (1870). The first book featured the island, the pirates and a character Tom Ayrton who was marooned on a nearby island. The second book featured Captain Nemo and the Nautilus presumed lost in the maelstrom at the end of that novel.

In The Mysterious Island (1874) after the escapees' balloon landed on the island, among many adventures, they encountered Ayrton alive, fought the pirates and discovered that Captain Nemo was their benefactor and the island the base for the Nautilus.

Casting
The film was mostly cast with British actors. Michael Craig was under contract to Rank. Michael Callan was under contract to Columbia at the time. Percy Herbert was originally rejected for his role due to his British accent, but got the part after practising a southern accent by watching Suddenly Last Summer several times.

Filming
Filming started 21 June 1960. The beach scenes in Mysterious Island were shot on location at Sa Conca Bay, Castell-Platja d'Aro in Catalonia, Spain. The escape from the Confederate prison - using an observation balloon - was filmed in Church Square, Shepperton, England.

Interiors were completed at Shepperton Studios.

The stop motion animation effects were created by Ray Harryhausen. All the model creatures except the giant bird (which was re-purposed for use as the Ornithomimus in The Valley of Gwangi in 1969) still exist.

Michael Craig called Endfield "a dismal arsehole of an ex-pat American" and Schneer "a real Hollywood suit... the epitome of 'the son in law also rises".

Soundtrack
The film's music was composed by Bernard Herrmann who had already scored two previous Harryhausen and Schneer productions (The 7th Voyage of Sinbad and The 3 Worlds of Gulliver). The score was performed by the London Symphony Orchestra.

Critical reception
In their review, The New York Times noted "the impressive white-haired person of Herbert Lom," "Cy Endfield's spirited direction," and that Joan Greenwood "gurgles and croaks in a pleasantly distracting style."; and in 1978, their TV critic called the film a "Dandy fantasy-adventure, done with skill and imagination, keyed by fine Bernard Herrman score. A pip of this kind." Time Magazine  said " It should thrill the geewillikers out of anyone!"  The film's rentals brought in over $5 million and was successful worldwide.

Home media
Blu-ray

ALL America - Twilight Time - The Limited Edition Series
Picture Format: 1.66:1 (1080p 24fps) [AVC MPEG-4]
Soundtrack(s): English DTS-HD Master Audio 5.1 and 2.0
Subtitles: English
Extras:
Isolated Score (presented in 2.0 Stereo)
Original Theatrical Trailer (2:31)
TV Trailer Spot #1 (1:03)
Case type: Keep Case
Note: Limited as in only 3,000 copies were made (none are numbered)

DVD

R1 America - Columbia/Tri-star Home Entertainment
Picture Format: 1.78:1 (Anamorphic) [NTSC]
Soundtrack(s): English Dolby Digital 2.0 mono
Subtitles: English, French, and Spanish
Extras:
"The Making Of Mysterious Island" featurette
"The Harryhausen Chronicles" featurette
"This Is Dynamation" featurette
Photo Gallery
Theatrical Trailer
Bonus trailers for The Golden Voyage of Sinbad and Sinbad and the Eye of the Tiger
Case type: Keep Case
Notes: Also available in The Fantastic Films of Ray Harryhausen: Legendary Science Fiction Series 5-disc box set, with Earth vs. the Flying Saucers, 20 Million Miles to Earth, It Came from Beneath the Sea, and H.G. Wells' First Men in the Moon.

LaserDisc

Columbia Tri-Star Video
 Picture Format: 1.33:1
 Soundtrack: English
 UPC: 043396767461
 
 Extras:
Ray Harryhausen on the making of the film
Posters, lobby cards

Pioneer Special Edition
 Picture Format: 1.33:1
 Soundtrack:  English
 UPC:  13023 26225
 Extras:
Premiere digital stereo soundtrack restoration
CAV presentation
Film score isolated on second audio channel
Trailer for The 7th Voyage of Sinbad
The Making of The 7th Voyage of Sinbad (This is Dynamation! vintage featurette)

See also
 List of stop-motion films

References

External links
 
 
 
 
 [https://web.archive.org/web/20110819082116/http://www.dbcult.com/movie-database/mysterious-island-1961/ Mysterious Island] at DBCult Film Institute
 

1961 animated films
1961 films
1960s fantasy adventure films
1960s science fiction adventure films
1960s monster movies
American fantasy adventure films
American Civil War films
American science fiction adventure films
British fantasy adventure films
British science fiction adventure films
Columbia Pictures films
Films directed by Cy Endfield
Films scored by Bernard Herrmann
Films set in 1865
Films set on islands
Films shot at Shepperton Studios
Films shot in Spain
Giant monster films
Films based on The Mysterious Island
Films based on science fiction novels
Films using stop-motion animation
Films about size change
Films adapted into comics
Films produced by Charles H. Schneer
1960s English-language films
1960s American films
1960s British films